A Son of the Sun is a 1912 novel by Jack London. It is set in the South Pacific at the beginning of the 20th century and consists of eight separate stories. David Grief is a forty-year-old English adventurer who came to the South seas years ago and became rich. As a businessman he owns offices in Sydney, but he is rarely there. Since his wealth spreads over a lot of islands, Grief has some adventures while going among these islands. London depicts the striking panorama of the South seas with adventurers, scoundrels, swindlers, pirates, and cannibals.

Contents

 A Son of the Sun (collecting debts from a stubborn debitor, the hard way)
 The Proud Goat of Aloysius Pankburn (getting an alcoholic sober with hard work and ambition)
 The Devils of Fuatino (getting sieged by pirates and sieging them back)
 The Jokers of New Gibbon (complicated dealings with man-eaters)
 A Little Account With Swithin Hall
 A Goboto Night
 The Feathers of the Sun (a crook introduces home-made paper money and is spanked with a particularly dead pig)
 The Pearls of Parlay

External links

 Project Gutenberg Complete Text
 The Jack London Online Collection Complete Text

1912 American novels
Novels by Jack London
American adventure novels
Novels set in the Pacific Ocean
Doubleday, Page & Company books
Novels about cannibalism